The Third Kramp-Karrenbauer cabinet was the state government of Saarland between 2017 and 2018, sworn in on 17 May 2017 after Annegret Kramp-Karrenbauer was elected as Minister-President of Saarland by the members of the Landtag of Saarland. It was the 27th Cabinet of Saarland.

It was formed after the 2017 Saarland state election by the Christian Democratic Union (CDU) and Social Democratic Party (SPD). Excluding the Minister-President, the cabinet comprised six ministers. Three were members of the CDU and three were members of the SPD.

After Kramp-Karrenbauer's resignation as Minister-President, the third Kramp-Karrenbauer cabinet was succeeded by the Hans cabinet on 1 March 2018.

Formation 
The previous cabinet was a grand coalition government of the CDU and SPD led by Minister-President Annegret Kramp-Karrenbauer of the CDU.

The election took place on 26 March 2017, and resulted in an improvement for the CDU and slight losses for the SPD. The opposition Left party also recorded a decline, while the AfD debuted at 6%.

Overall, the incumbent coalition retained an increased majority. The CDU could also achieve a majority with either The Left or AfD, but had ruled out cooperation with either party before the election. The day after the election, the CDU and SPD agreed to begin talks to renew their coalition. Formal negotiations began on 7 April. They finalised a coalition agreement on 3 May. It subsequently received approval from both parties, with the SPD congress voting 97% in favour and the CDU unanimously.

Kramp-Karrenbauer was elected as Minister-President by the Landtag on 17 May, winning 41 votes out of 51 cast.

Composition 
The composition of the cabinet at the time of its dissolution was as follows:

References 

Politics of Saarland
State governments of Germany
Cabinets established in 2017
2017 establishments in Germany
German state cabinets
2018 disestablishments in Germany
Cabinets disestablished in 2018